The City of Melville local government area lies within the traditional lands of the Beeliar people, a subgroup of the Whadjuk dialectical group of the Noongar Indigenous Australians.
These are several significant Noongar sites within the City of Melville.

References

City of Melville
Places of Noongar significance
Noongar sites in the City of Melville